Starkówko  is a village in the administrative district of Gmina Trzebielino, within Bytów County, Pomeranian Voivodeship, in northern Poland.

For details of the history of the region, see History of Pomerania.

The village has a population of 45.

Notable people 
 Stanisław Wagner (born 1947 in Starkówko) a Polish former sprinter who competed in the 1972 Summer Olympics

References

Villages in Bytów County